Marcel Henri Vandernotte (29 July 1909 – 15 December 1993) was a French rower who competed in the 1932 Summer Olympics and in the 1936 Summer Olympics.

He was born in Nantes. He was the younger brother of Fernand Vandernotte and the uncle of Noël Vandernotte. In 1932 he was eliminated with his brother Fernand in the repechage of the coxed pair event. Four years later he won the bronze medal as crew member of the French boat in the coxed four competition.

References

1909 births
1993 deaths
French male rowers
Olympic rowers of France
Rowers at the 1932 Summer Olympics
Rowers at the 1936 Summer Olympics
Olympic bronze medalists for France
Olympic medalists in rowing
Medalists at the 1936 Summer Olympics
European Rowing Championships medalists
20th-century French people